The River Cities Cup, also known as the Dirty River Derby, is a rivalry between American soccer clubs representing Cincinnati, Ohio and Louisville, Kentucky. From 2016 to 2018, the cities were respectively represented in the second-tier league now known as the USL Championship by FC Cincinnati and Louisville City FC. Both teams played in the Eastern Conference of what was then known as the United Soccer League, and the River Cities Cup was contested solely in regular-season matches between the two sides, with the winner of the regular-season series claiming the cup. After the 2018 season, FC Cincinnati ceased USL operations, with the ownership group having been awarded a Major League Soccer franchise that began play under the FC Cincinnati name in 2019. From that point forward, the rivalry only takes place if the two teams are drawn together in the U.S. Open Cup, with the first such meeting after FC Cincinnati's arrival in MLS taking place in 2019.

The teams are located in cities situated on the Ohio River and are separated by roughly 100 miles of Interstate 71. The winner of the regular-season series won the cup for that year. 

The last regular-season league match between the teams took place on September 11, 2018, with FC Cincinnati winning 1–0. The final cup holders are Louisville City, who retained the cup by winning the previous two regular-season matches that season.

Beginnings

Previous clubs 
Before the formation of Louisville City and FC Cincinnati, various soccer clubs, both professional and amateur, played in the respective regions. The Derby City Rovers played in the fourth-division Premier Development League and played at the Woehrle Sports Complex in Louisville's northern suburb, Jeffersonville, Indiana. The Louisville metropolitan area also housed two indoor soccer teams prior to Louisville City: the Louisville Lightning, who played in the Major Arena Soccer League from 2009 until 2013, and the Louisville Thunder who played in the American Indoor Soccer Association from 1984 until 1987.

The rivalry between the two cities long predates the arrival of professional soccer in the region; most notably, the largest universities in the two cities, the University of Cincinnati and University of Louisville, had a longstanding football rivalry that ended in 2013 due to conference realignment.

Formation of the USL clubs 
Both clubs were formed in the early to mid 2010s. The formation of Louisville City FC began with the formation of the club's current supporters group, The Coopers, whom aimed to build a grassroots support base to bring a professional soccer team to Louisville. The following year, a local ownership group invited the owners of Orlando City to meet with the Coopers supporters group. In 2015, the team Louisville City was born and served as the USL affiliate for Orlando City as they jumped from USL to Major League Soccer. In 2016, the affiliation ended with Orlando City creating its own reserve team to field in USL.

That same year, reports swirled of USL seeking expansion into Cincinnati. The formation of the ownership group came from a partnership between the Cincinnati Bengals NFL franchise and the former soccer club in the region, the Cincinnati Kings, when Jeff Berding was named as part of the potential ownership group. In the summer of 2015, more details on the new club were announced. The Lindner family, of American Financial Group headquartered in Cincinnati, was announced the owner of the new club with Carl Lindner III representing the owners at the press conference. Subsequently the team name "FC Cincinnati" was announced as the club's name, as well as their coach, and stadium.

Naming 
While already unofficially known among fans as "The Dirty River Derby", an online poll by both clubs was released asking fans what their preferred name for the series cup would be. Amongst the options included the "River Cities Cup", the "Steamboat Cup", the "Royal Cup", the "100 Mile Cup" or the "Riverboat Rivalry Cup". On February 5, 2016 it was announced the "River Cities Cup" had won.

Rivalry

First season (2016) 
The two teams played their first match on April 16, 2016 at Nippert Stadium in Cincinnati in front of a then-USL-record crowd of 20,497. Cincinnati jumped to an early lead over Louisville with a sixth minute goal from Austin Berry. Louisville's Chandler Hoffman scored the first hat-trick in series history, scoring three unanswered goals for Louisville in the next 30 minutes to give Louisville a 3–1 lead over Cincinnati. In the 40th minute, Louisville's Sean Reynolds received the first red card in series history and Louisville played the final 50 minutes down to ten men. Cincinnati was able to score a late goal in the 90th minute, but the match ended 3–2 in Louisville's favor. The return leg in Louisville ended as a scoreless draw as four yellow cards were dished out. Cincinnati would ultimately win the series in 2016 against Louisville, by earning a 2–0 victory on July 23, 2016. USL golden boot winner, Sean Okoli scored the insurance goal.

Biting controversy (2017) 

The rivalry continued into its second season when Louisville visited Cincinnati for a USL match on Saturday, April 22, 2017. Tensions rose between the clubs after an incident in the 87th minute, when Cincinnati forward Djiby Fall was shown a straight red card and then briefly had an exchange of words with Louisville midfielder Niall McCabe before exiting the pitch. In a post-match interview, Louisville head coach James O'Connor alleged Djiby bit McCabe's cheek during this exchange. FC Cincinnati denied the claims the next day, writing in a statement, "We have seen no evidence to substantiate the allegations made by Louisville City Head Coach James O'Connor and it is our belief his post-match comments are not true. [...] Any attempt to portray Djiby as a dirty player is extremely unfair."

Fans of both clubs clashed on social media for several days in the wake of the allegations. The USL's weekly disciplinary report, published the following Wednesday, announced that Djiby's red card suspension would be extended to six games for "major game misconduct", which they later confirmed was for biting an opponent. FC Cincinnati manager Jeff Berding sent out a newsletter to fans the next day, stating that the USL decision had come after a failed appeal attempt by Cincinnati. He wrote that the club respected the USL decision even though they disagreed with it, and that the club continued to support Djiby, stating, "[we] will welcome him when he returns and I hope you will do the same."

Rivalry continues (2017–2018) 

Louisville and Cincinnati faced each other in their first non-USL match on May 31, 2017, when they met in the third round of the 2017 U.S. Open Cup, again hosted in Cincinnati. Although Djiby's six-game suspension (originating from the previous Cincinnati–Louisville match) had not yet ended, he was allowed to play as in-league suspensions do not apply to the U.S. Open Cup. Cincinnati won 1–0, with Djiby scoring the sole goal at the 48th minute. 

The two clubs did not meet again until the next season, when Louisville won 1–0 at FC Cincinnati's home opener on April 7, 2018. Lou City officially retained the cup for 2018 with a 2–0 win on May 26, also at Nippert Stadium. Cincinnati defeated Louisville 1–0 in the final regular season match between the two clubs on September 11, 2018.

FC Cincinnati leaves USL (2019–present) 
FC Cincinnati moved up to Major League Soccer after the 2018 USL season, putting the two teams in different leagues for the first time. The cup is no longer officially recognized since the teams are not guaranteed to compete every season. The two teams met in the fourth round of the 2019 U.S. Open Cup on June 12, 2019 at Nippert Stadium.

Results 
Home team is listed on the left, away team is listed on the right. Home team's score is listed first.

Top goalscorers 

. Does not include own goals.

Players who played for both clubs

References

External links 
 

FC Cincinnati
Louisville City FC
Sports competitions in Cincinnati
Sports in Louisville, Kentucky
Soccer rivalries in the United States
2016 establishments in Kentucky
2016 establishments in Ohio